The 5th Exotic is the first album by Quantic, released on May 31, 2001.

Track listing
[00:00:00] 01. Introduction
[00:00:43] 02. The 5th Exotic
[00:04:51] 03. Snakes in the Grass
[00:10:03] 04. Infinite Regression (Sample taken from the film Escape from the Planet of the Apes)
[00:13:24] 05. Life in the Rain
[00:19:57] 06. Long Road Ahead
[00:23:45] 07. Common Knowledge
[00:29:58] 08. The Picture Inside
[00:34:11] 09. Through These Eyes
[00:39:32] 10. Time is the Enemy
[00:43:12] 11. In the Key of Blue
[00:50:05] 12. Meaning

External links
Official album page
Discogs

2001 albums
Will Holland albums